Henry A. Lester is an American biologist, currently the Bren Professor at California Institute of Technology.

He received an A.B. from Harvard College in 1966 and a Ph.D. from Rockefeller University in 1971.

References

Year of birth missing (living people)
Living people
California Institute of Technology faculty
21st-century American biologists
Harvard University alumni
Rockefeller University alumni
Presidents of the Biophysical Society